How to Make Love Like a Porn Star: A Cautionary Tale is the autobiography of adult film star Jenna Jameson, published August 17, 2004. It was mainly written by co-writer Neil Strauss, later famous for writing The Game, and published by ReganBooks, a division of HarperCollins. It was an instant best-seller, spending six weeks on the New York Times Best Seller list. The autobiography also won the 2004 "Mainstream's Adult Media Favorite" XRCO award in a tie with Seymore Butts's Family Business TV series.

Overview
The nearly 600 page book is divided into Books numbered with Roman numerals, each preceded by an epigraph from a Shakespearean sonnet. The narrative is told through a series of first person accounts, interviews with her family, diary entries in a font resembling handwriting, personal photos, movie scripts, and comic book panels. It covers her life from her childhood to her beginning in show business as a stripper, living with her tattoo artist biker boyfriend, and ends with her receiving the Hot D'Or award at Cannes and her second wedding. Jameson tells of multiple rapes, drug addictions, an unhappy first marriage, and numerous affairs with men and women.

Film
Jameson has expressed interest in having actress Scarlett Johansson play her in a feature film version of the book. A representative for Johansson, however, has stated that Johansson has no interest in such a role.

Related book
Strauss has written a similarly titled and themed book, How to Make Money Like a Porn Star, mainly in graphic novel format, and without Jameson's participation. Strauss wrote it from stories he learned of while researching Jameson's book. Like How to Make Love..., How to Make Money... also features different formats, including magazine articles, fake advertisements, and an activity book.

Reception
The New York Times stated that "for aspiring performers, it's a gold mine."
Publishers Weekly calls it "a remarkably appealing and honest mess"

References

External links
 YouTube internview for Playboy channel show "Jenna's American Sex Star" (2006)
(May 2006)
( June 2006)

2004 non-fiction books
Collaborative non-fiction books
Show business memoirs
Non-fiction books about pornography
Jenna Jameson
ReganBooks books